Baniana significans is a species of moth of the  family Erebidae. It is found in Cuba and Santo Domingo.

External links
A review of the subfamily Anobinae with the description of a new species of Baniana Walker from North and Central America (Lepidoptera, Erebidae, Anobinae)

Erebidae